I Was a Spy is a 1933 British thriller film directed by Victor Saville and starring Madeleine Carroll, Herbert Marshall, and Conrad Veidt. Based on the 1932 memoir I Was a Spy by Marthe Cnockaert, the film is about her experiences as a Belgian woman who nursed German soldiers during World War I while passing intelligence to the British.

I Was a Spy was also the first film dubbed in Poland (while there were earlier examples of films dubbed in Polish, they were recorded in Paramount studio in Joinville, France), released in 1935 as Siostra Marta jest szpiegiem, starring Lidia Wysocka as Martha Cnockhaert's voice. The screenplay was written by Edmund Gwenn.

Plot

In German-occupied Belgium in 1914, a local woman nurses injured German soldiers while passing information to the British.

Cast

 Madeleine Carroll as Marthe Cnockaert
 Herbert Marshall as Stephan
 Conrad Veidt as Commandant Oberaertz
 Edmund Gwenn as Burgomaster
 Gerald du Maurier as Doctor
 Donald Calthrop as Cnockhaert
 May Agate as Madame Cnockhaert
 Eva Moore as Canteen Ma
 Martita Hunt as Aunt Lucille
 Nigel Bruce as Scottie
 George Merritt as Captain Reichmann
 Anthony Bushell as Otto

Production
Filming took place in Shepherds Bush. Producer Michael Balcon sent Herbert Mason (who was initially production manager before becoming an assistant director) to take the script to Belgium and give it to Marthe Cnockaert to look at.

The script was written by Edmund Gwenn who also portrayed the burgomaster.

Release

I Was a Spy was screened at the Lyric.

Reception
In a poll conducted by the magazine Film Weekly, the film was voted the best British movie of 1933, and Madeleine Carroll's performance was voted the best in a British movie.

The Daily Mail (21 November 1933) described it as "the most splendid film produced in this country." The Daily Despatch (21 November 1933) described it as a film "equal to Hollywood's best." Variety and motion picture critic Mordaunt Hall (for The New York Times) praised Carroll's acting.

William Troy for The Nation said, "It is the kind of picture calculated to make us believe that there is something beautiful and touching about war, after all."

Film historian and critic Paul Rotha for Cinema Quarterly said, "It is the kind of picture calculated to make us believe that there is something beautiful and touching about war, after all."Really? Two reviewers said the same thing? Check citation please

The Evening News (Rockhampton) (30 May 1934) praised the acting and described it as "[spectacular] in its sweep, human in its emotions, dramatic in its intensity and profoundly gripping in its appeal."

Although it was very successful at the box office, this was not Saville's reaction. He watched the completed I Was a Spy with one of the Assistant Directors, Herbert Mason, and was devastated: however, Mason reassured him that it was his "best to date."

Halliwell's Film & Video Guide described the film as "[good] standard war espionage melodrama."

Adrian Turner for Radio Times said that, "Fans of vintage British cinema will enjoy this sprightly espionage yarn, set during the First World War and bearing a close resemblance to the Mata Hari legend."

In 2021, film critic and author, Derek Winnert praised the cast and their performances.

Home media
I Was a Spy was released on DVD on 19 May 2014.

References
Citations

Bibliography

Primary sources

 Film Weekly, 4 May 1934, p. 9
 Daily Despatch, 21 November 1933
 Daily Mail, 21 November 1933
 The Sun (Sydney), 13 May 1934
 The Evening News (Rockhampton), 30 May 1934

Secondary sources

 Balcon, Michael. (1969). Michael Balcon Presents...A Lifetime of Films. Hutchinson & Co Ltd
 McFarlane Brian. (ed). The Encyclopedia of British Film. Methuen (2nd edition)
 Moseley, Roy. (2000). Evergreen: Victor Saville in His Own Words. Southern Illinois University Press
 Pascoe, John. (2020). Madeleine Carroll: Actress and Humanitarian, from The 39 Steps to the Red. McFarland. Paperback
 Walker, John. (ed). (1998). Halliwell's Film & Video Guide 1998. HarperCollins Entertainment. 13th edition

External links
 
 I Was a Spy at BFI
 I Was a Spy (1933) at Britmovie | Home of British Films
 I Was a Spy at Park Circus
 I Was a Spy at Rotten Tomatoes

1933 films
1930s spy thriller films
British spy thriller films
Western Front (World War I) films
World War I spy films
Films produced by Michael Balcon
British black-and-white films
Fox Film films
Gainsborough Pictures films
Films shot at British International Pictures Studios
1930s English-language films
1930s American films
1930s British films